The Cabbage Whitefly (Aleyrodes proletella) is a species of whitefly from the Aleyrodidae family. It has a global distribution.

Adults are 1,5 mm in length. They have white wings with four gray spots. The wings are white due to a powdery wax. The head and thorax are dark, while the underside is yellow and also covered with a layer of wax. The eyes are red.

The species is a pest on various Brassica species (mainly Brussels sprout and Kale) and Fragaria. It also feeds on various wild plants, including Capsella bursa-pastoris. It is found in colonies on the backside of leaves. They suck in the phloem of the leaves and pollute these by excreting honeydew, causing mold growth.

There are usually four to five generations per year. The development of a generation varies from three to six weeks. A female can lay up to 150 eggs.

References

Whiteflies
Agricultural pest insects
Bugs described in 1758
Taxa named by Carl Linnaeus